Simone Calori (born 23 July 1980) is an Italian football coach and a former player who played as a defender.

Playing career
Born in Montevarchi, the Province of Arezzo, Tuscany, Calori started his career at Serie D club Colligiana. In 1999, he was signed by Cagliari. From 2000 to 2006, Calori spent 6 seasons with Sangiovannese, a team also located in the Province of Arezzo. In 2006, he moved to Pisa, Tuscany. Calori played 31 matches in 2006–07 Serie C1. Calori also played all 4 matches in the promotion playoffs, winning promotion back to Serie B.

In July 2007, Calori moved to fellow Serie B club Mantova. He only played 18 games in 2007–08 Serie B, including 7 starts. On 25 June 2008, 5 days before the closure of 2007–08 financial year, Calori and Valerio Di Cesare were swapped with Mattia Marchesetti and Riccardo Fissore. Calori also re-joined former Pisa team-mate Giovanni Passiglia at Vicenza. Both Mantova and Vicenza valued the players for €1.5 million, also signing 3-year contract. Di Cesare was valued €1,000,000, Calori for €500,000; Marchesetti €1,000,000 and Fissore €500,000.

Calori failed to make his league debut for Vicenza. In January 2009 Calori left for Perugia of Lega Pro Prima Divisione in temporary deal. In the next season Calori left for another third division club Taranto along with Julián Magallanes.

In summer 2010, Vicenza sold Calori to Pisa for free (along with Passiglia) and Di Cesare to Torino for just €250,000. The club had to write-down the residual value of the contracts partially or in full.

Calori was signed by Serie D club Salerno in summer 2011. The club finished as the Group G winner and directly promoted back to the fourth division – the lowest level of the professional league.

In December 2012 he was signed by Giacomense.

Coaching career
On 28 April 2019, Serie D club Sangiovannese that he was playing for at the time, announced that he has been appointed the head coach of the team. He was sacked on 21 January 2020 after six defeats in a row.

Footnotes

References

External links
 Lega Serie B Profile 
 Football.it Profile 

Italian footballers
Serie B players
A.S.D. Olimpia Colligiana players
A.S.D. Sangiovannese 1927 players
Pisa S.C. players
Mantova 1911 players
L.R. Vicenza players
A.C. Perugia Calcio players
Taranto F.C. 1927 players
U.S. Salernitana 1919 players
F.C. Matera players
Rimini F.C. 1912 players
Association football defenders
Sportspeople from Arezzo
1980 births
Living people
Italian football managers
Footballers from Tuscany